The Humboldt River is an extensive river drainage system located in north-central Nevada. It extends in a general east-to-west direction from its headwaters in the Jarbidge, Independence, and Ruby Mountains in Elko County, to its terminus in the Humboldt Sink, approximately 225 direct miles away in northwest Churchill County. It is the only major river system wholly contained within the state of Nevada.

It is the only natural transportation artery across the Great Basin and has historically provided a route for westward migration. Additionally, two major railroad routes loosely follow its path. Interstate 80 follows the river's course from its source to its mouth. The river is named for the German naturalist Alexander von Humboldt.

History

The region of the river in northern Nevada was sparsely inhabited by Numic-speaking people at the time of the arrival of European American settlers. The region was little known by non-indigenous peoples until the arrival of fur trappers in the early 19th century.

The first recorded sighting of the river was on November 9, 1828, by Peter Skene Ogden of the Hudson's Bay Company, during his fifth expedition to the Snake Country. Odgen came southward along the Little Humboldt, encountering the main river at the confluence near Winnemucca. Ogden explored the river for several hundred miles, blazing a trail along it and making the first known map of the region. He initially named the river "Unknown River", due to the source and course of the river still unknown to him, and later "Paul's River", after one of his trappers who died on the expedition and was buried on the river bank. He later changed it again to "Mary's River," named after the Native American wife of one of his trappers, which later somehow became "St. Mary's River". However, in 1829 he suggested that "Swampy River" best described the course he had traversed. In 1833 the Bonneville–Walker fur party explored the river, naming it "Barren River". Washington Irving's 1837 book describing the Bonneville expedition called it "Ogden's River", the name used by many early travelers. By the early 1840s, the trail along the river was being used by settlers going west to California. The river provided drinkable water to earlier travelers on foot, but later emigrants using wagons required the significant riparian vegetation along its length as forage for their draft animals.

In 1841 the river (then known as Mary's River) first became the route of the California Trail with the Bartleson–Bidwell Party, later becoming the primary land route for migrants to the California gold fields. In 1845 the river was explored by John C. Frémont, who made a thorough map of the region and gave the river its current name. In 1869 the river was used as part of the route of the Central Pacific segment of the Transcontinental Railroad.

In the 20th century, the valley of the river became the route for U.S. Route 40, later replaced by Interstate 80. In the latter part of the 20th century, about 45,000 people lived within  of the river, roughly a third of the population at that time of the State of Nevada outside of Western Nevada and Southern Nevada, before the rapid 21st-century growth of Southern Nevada changed these population figures.

Watershed and course

The Humboldt River can be divided geographically into the upper, middle, and lower divisions based on Palisade Canyon and Emigrant Canyon being the major constriction points along the Humboldt River Valley.

A hydrologic definition instead divides the Humboldt River drainage into two basins—one above and one below Palisade—based on flows that increase above and decrease below this part of the river. The major tributaries of the upper Humboldt River basin are (heading downstream) Bishop Creek, Marys River, Lamoille Creek, North Fork Humboldt River, South Fork Humboldt River, Susie Creek, Maggie Creek, and Marys Creek; and of the lower basin they are Pine Creek, Reese River, and the Little Humboldt River.

The source of the main stem of the river is a spring called Humboldt Wells at the northern tip of the East Humboldt Range, just outside the city of Wells. The river flows west-southwest through Elko County past the communities of Elko and Carlin.

In northern Eureka County it passes through Palisade Canyon between the south end of the Tuscarora Mountains and the north end of the Shoshone Range.

Past the junction with the Little Humboldt, the river turns southwest, flowing past Winnemucca and through Pershing County, along the western side of the Humboldt Range and the West Humboldt Range.

The river gains most of its water from snowmelt in the mountains in the eastern part of the watershed, most importantly the Ruby Mountains, Jarbidge Mountains, and Independence Mountains. River flow generally decreases downstream to the west, partly due to water removal from the river for irrigation, especially near Lovelock. Stream-gauge measurements undertaken by the United States Geological Survey suggest that Palisade Canyon, between Carlin and Beowawe, is the point where the river's flow ceases to increase and begins to decrease. Also, since the Humboldt's water comes almost exclusively from snowmelt, its flow is highly variable from season to season (peak flow occurs during the spring melt) and from year to year (depending on the amount of snow every winter)

Ecology

The Lahontan cutthroat trout (Oncorhynchus clarki henshawi) is an inland subspecies of cutthroat trout endemic to northern Nevada, eastern California, and southern Oregon. In 1970 the U.S. Fish and Wildlife Service (USFWS) listed the Lahontan cutthroat trout (LCT) as “endangered”. In 1975 it reclassified LCT as “threatened” to facilitate management and to allow regulated fishing. Genetic and meristic studies of LCT indicate that the Humboldt River Basin LCT is a unique subspecies of cutthroat trout.

North American beaver (Castor canadensis) seem to have been making a comeback in Elko County possibly due to less fur trapping combined with reduced consumption of riparian willow and other vegetation by cattle. Maggie and Susie Creeks, which enter the Humboldt River near Carlin, have benefited from 20 years of work by ranchers, agencies, mines, and non-profit groups via improvements in grazing techniques and specific projects. A remote sensing project found 107 beaver dams along  of Maggie Creek in 2006, which rose to 271 dams in 2010. Beaver dams are accelerating the recovery of riparian vegetation and widening the riparian zone as they slow the water and collect sediment that used to be lost downstream. The impounded water is seeping into the ground and raising the water table. Newmont's shallow groundwater monitoring wells along Maggie Creek have shown about a  rise over the past 17 years along Maggie Creek. Stream flows are more perennial, making more water available for wildlife and livestock and protecting populations of native trout. Maggie Creek has a Beaver Creek tributary which flows from Beaver Peak in the Tuscarora Mountains.

Environmental Aspects 

The Humboldt River and its surrounding areas have raised some concern about the increasing levels of toxic elements such as arsenic and mercury. These elements are showing up in fish and other wildlife that consume the water. The quantity being absorbed by fish specifically is not of concerning levels though. Brumbaugh and May took samples of fish from the south fork of the Humboldt River. They determined mercury levels within the fish were between 0.061 and 0.082 micrograms per gram of flesh. This is well below the EPA's guideline of 0.30 micrograms per gram. However, though low levels are found in animals, many people are concerned that drinking water and surrounding land is still contaminated. They believe the contamination came from prior mining excursions. Mercury was commonly mined in the area and so was gold. Whether it was leeching from the gold mining process or leftover mercury ore, these toxic elements entered the environment and waterway. Since then, these levels have gone down considerably. The U.S. Geological Survey and other committees conducted a couple of surveys to determine the safety of the drinking water. In 1962 the Water Resources Bulletin, out of Carson City, conducted one of the first main tests. This preliminary test was to determine every mineral, element and ion present. The next big test was done in 1985 by the U.S. Geological Survey. They took samples from a much more local area and determined concentrations were high, but not abnormally high. Another more recent test, which was done in 2002, was specifically on mercury being leeched from abandoned mines. However, this test determined that mercury levels dropped off very quickly the further away the tests were done. Finally, the most recent study, done in 2019, was an extremely comprehensive test which included samples from numerous places throughout the river's path. This test was based out of the University of Nevada Reno and determined what elements and minerals were present. It also determined that toxic element concentrations were fairly consistent. This means that while these elements are present, they do not pose a severe threat.

See also

 List of Nevada rivers
 Sarah Winnemucca

References

Further reading
Wallace, A.R. et al. (2005). Metallic mineral resource assessment of the Humboldt River Basin, northern Nevada (USGS Fact Sheet 2005-3023]. Reno, NV: U.S. Department of the Interior, U.S. Geological Survey.
Yager, D.B. and H.W. Folger. (2003). Map showing silver concentrations from stream sediments and soils throughout the Humboldt River Basin and surrounding areas, northern Nevada [U.S. Geological Survey Miscellaneous Field Studies Map MF-2407-I]. Denver, CO: U.S. Department of the Interior, U.S. Geological Survey.

External links
 

 
Rivers of Elko County, Nevada
Rivers of Nevada
Rivers of the Great Basin
Alexander von Humboldt